The sixth full elections for Guildford Borough Council took place on 2 May 1991.  The Conservatives lost control of Guildford Borough Council for the first time since the council was created in the early 1970s.  Overall the election resulted in a hung council with 19 Conservative councillors, 19 Liberal Democrats, 6 Labour and 1 independent.

Relative to the 1987 elections the Conservatives lost 11 seats, the Liberal Democrats gained 10 and one gain was made by an independent.

The Liberal Democrats gained all six seats in the Ash and Tongham area from the Conservatives consisting of the following wards Ash, Ash Vale and Tongham.

Additionally the Liberal Democrats gained four seats in the town of Guildford from the Conservatives.  These 4 gains were as follows - the remaining Conservative councillor for Onslow ward; both Conservative councillors for Holy Trinity and one of the two Conservatives councillors for Christchurch.

An independent captured a seat from the Conservatives in the rural Tillingbourne ward to the south west of the borough.

Results

References

1991
1991 English local elections
1990s in Surrey